Edmund Peter Skirving Colquhoun (born 29 March 1945 in Prestonpans) is a Scottish former footballer, who played for Sheffield United and Scotland. He played in the position of centre back.

Known to players and fans as Eddie Colquhoun, he started his professional football career with Bury in 1962. He made 81 league appearances and scored twice for them. He moved on to West Bromwich Albion in 1967.

In 1968, Sheffield United had just been relegated to Second Division. Their manager at the time was Arthur Rowley, and he signed Colquhoun from West Brom for £27,500.

He made his debut for Sheffield United against Huddersfield Town on 19 October 1968. Colquhoun was uncompromising, hard tackling and a leader in his play, and was instantly made team captain for his home debut at Bramall Lane against Charlton Athletic on 26 October 1968, in a match United won 2–0. The following week he scored his first Sheffield United goal, against Portsmouth at Fratton Park on 2 November.

Colquhoun proved to be an excellent signing and was an integral part of the Sheffield United side which won promotion to the First Division in season 1970–71. He made a total of 416 appearances (363 league) with 21 goals (21 league) in all competitions for Sheffield United between 1968 and 1978.

A sign of his popularity was the chant containing his name;
We ain't got a barrel of money, But we've got Woodward and Currie, And with Eddie Colquhoun, Promotion is soon, United.

He won eleven international caps for Scotland between 1967 and 1973. Colquhoun played in two games during a 1967 overseas tour that the Scottish Football Association decided in October 2021 to reclassify as full internationals, which increased his cap tally from nine to eleven.

His grandson Ben Wiles plays for Rotherham United

References

External links
 Profile of Eddie Colquhoun
 NASL stats

1945 births
Living people
Scottish footballers
Sheffield United F.C. players
Bury F.C. players
West Bromwich Albion F.C. players
Scotland international footballers
Association football central defenders
Scottish expatriate footballers
North American Soccer League (1968–1984) indoor players
North American Soccer League (1968–1984) players
Detroit Express players
People from Prestonpans
Washington Diplomats (NASL) players
Footballers from East Lothian
Expatriate soccer players in the United States
Scotland under-23 international footballers
Scottish expatriate sportspeople in the United States